The 2012 season was the 107th season of competitive football in Norway.

The season began on 25 March 2012 for Tippeligaen, with 1. divisjon started 9 April 2012. First round of 2. divisjon was scheduled to 14 April 2012. 1. divisjon ended on 11 October 2012, while Tippeligaen finished on 18 November 2012. The Cup Final was played on 25 November 2012.

Men's football

Promotion and relegation

League season

Tippeligaen

1. divisjon

2. divisjon

Group 1

Group 2

Group 3

Group 4

3. divisjon

Norwegian Football Cup

Final

Women's football

League season

Toppserien

1. divisjon

Norwegian Women's Cup

Final
 Røa 0–4 Stabæk

Men's UEFA competitions
These are the results of Norway's teams in European competitions during the 2012 season. (Norway team score displayed first)

* For group games in Champions League or Europa League, score in home game is displayed
** For group games in Champions League or Europa League, score in away game is displayed

UEFA Women's Champions League

Knockout stage

Round of 32

|}

Round of 16

|}

National teams

Norway men's national football team

2014 FIFA World Cup qualification (UEFA)

The Norway national football team played four games in the qualification for 2014 FIFA World Cup.

Group E

Friendlies
Norway will also participate in a number of friendly matches.

Norway women's national football team

Managerial changes

Events of the season

February
20 February 2011: Knut Torbjørn Eggen, the coach of the U-19 team and formerly head coach of Moss and Fredrikstad passes away at the age of 51.

March
23 March 2012: In the opening match of Tippeligaen, Molde wins 2–1 at home against Strømsgodset.

25 March 2012: Sogndal beats Odd Grenland 4–0, and is on top of the table for the first time in history.

April
1 April 2012: In Haugesund's 2–0 win against Molde, Alexander Søderlund's goal was never across the line and the debate about goal-line technology is again raised.

9 April 2012: Sogndal collect their first point against Rosenborg at Lerkendal Stadion, having lost the first 13 meetings at Lerkendal. In the opening match of Adeccoligaen, the two teams relegated from Tippeligaen, Start and Sarpsborg 08 draws 4–4.

15 April 2012: Sogndal's goalkeeper Kenneth Udjus surpasses Rosenborg's Daniel Örlund as the goalkeeper with the longest clean sheet since 1991. Udjus' new record is 558 minutes, while Örlund's clean sheet lasted for 553 minutes.

September
16 September 2012: Kristiansund BK secures promotion to the 1. divisjon after winning the 2012 2. divisjon group 2.

References

 
Seasons in Norwegian football